Arakiite (IMA symbol: Ark) is a rare mineral with the formula (Zn,Mn2+)(Mn2+,Mg)12(Fe3+,Al)2(As3+O3)(As5+O4)2(OH)23. It is both arsenate and arsenite mineral, a combination that is rare in the world of minerals. Arakiite is stoichiometrically similar to hematolite. It is one of many rare minerals coming from the famous Långban manganese skarn deposit in Sweden. Other minerals bearing both arsenite and zinc include kraisslite and mcgovernite.

The mineral crystallizes in the monoclinic crystal system in space group Cc.

References

Zinc minerals
Manganese(II) minerals
Iron(III) minerals
Arsenate minerals
Monoclinic minerals
Minerals in space group 9
Minerals described in 2000